Sam Gray may refer to:

 Sam Gray (baseball) (1897–1953), pitcher in Major League Baseball
 Sam Gray (musician), British singer-songwriter
 Sam Gray (footballer, born 1880) (1880–1944), Australian rules footballer
 Sam Gray (footballer, born 1992), Australian rules footballer

See also 
 Samuel Gray (disambiguation)
 Sam Grey (disambiguation)